Portuguese Macau (officially the Province of Macau until 1976, and then the Autonomous Region of Macau from 1976 to 1999) was a Portuguese colony that existed from the first official Portuguese settlement in 1557 to the end of colonial rule and the transfer of sovereignty over Macau to the People's Republic of China in 1999. It comprised the Municipality of Macau and the Municipality of Ilhas. Macau was both the first and last European holding in China.

Overview 
Macau's history under Portugal can be broadly divided into three distinct political periods. The first was the establishment of the Portuguese settlement in 1557 to 1849. The Portuguese had jurisdiction over the Portuguese community and certain aspects of the territory's administration but no real sovereignty. Next came the colonial period, which scholars generally place from 1849 to 1974. As Macau's importance among other territories grew within the Portuguese Empire, Portuguese sovereignty over Macau strengthened and became a constitutional part of Portuguese territory. Chinese sovereignty during this era was mainly nominal. Finally, the third was the transition period or post-colonial period, after the Carnation Revolution in 1974 until the handover in 1999.

Wu Zhiliang more specifically identified six periods:
The early relationship between the Chinese and Portuguese (1514–1583)
The Senado (Senate) period (1583–1783)
The decline of the Senado (1783–1849)
The colonial period (1849–1976)
The district autonomy period (1976–1988)
The transition period (1988–1999)

History 
Through archaeological studies, many artefacts have been discovered that indicate that the Chinese had already settled in Macau between 4,000 and 6,000 years ago and 5,000 years ago in Coloane.

According to certain historical records Chinese merchant ships from Canton that traded with peoples of Southeast Asia often stopped in or near Macao to supply themselves with water and food, at least from the 5th century onwards.

In 1277, about 50,000 supporters and some members of the Song dynasty, fleeing the Mongol invaders, arrived in Macau and built several settlements, the largest and most important being in the Mong-Há region in the north of Macau. It is believed that the oldest temple in Macau, the Temple of Kun Iam (Goddess of Mercy), was located in Mong-Há.

During the Ming dynasty, many fishermen from Guangzhou and Fujian settled in Macau and it was they who built the Temple of A-Ma.

Arrival of the Portuguese
The first Portuguese to visit China was Jorge Álvares, in 1513, during the Age of Discovery. He erected a padrão with the arms of Portugal in the port of Tamau, located on a neighboring island of Sancho (or Sanchoão) at the mouth of the Pearl River, near Macau. This visit was followed by the establishment in the area of numerous Portuguese traders, who would erect temporary wooden buildings that would be destroyed when the traders left, having done their business. The Portuguese were not yet allowed to stay, obtaining only visitor status.

In 1517, Fernão Pires de Andrade, the head of a Portuguese expedition to China, managed to negotiate with the Chinese authorities in Canton for the entry of the Portuguese ambassador Tomé Pires to Beijing and the establishment of a trading post in Tamão. But, due to the barbaric attitudes of his brother Simão de Andrade (who built a fortress in Tamão), Tomé Pires was arrested and killed by the Chinese authorities in Beijing and the Chinese Emperor prohibited trade with the Portuguese.

Despite this order, Portuguese traders continued their lucrative activity and the mandarins of the area allowed the Portuguese to settle on the island of Sanchuão to continue their business.

In 1542, the Portuguese, who already frequented the eastern coasts of China, settled in Liam Pó. But in 1545 this community, which at the time had about 3,000 inhabitants, was razed by a Chinese army of 60,000 in five hours. The Portuguese tried to settle in Chin-Cheu, but were expelled again in 1549.

The Portuguese were defeated by the Ming Chinese at the Battle of Sincouwaan at Lantau Island and Shuangyu in 1548, where several Portuguese were captured, and near the Dongshan Peninsula in 1549, where two Portuguese junks and Galeote Pereira were captured. During these battles the Ming Chinese captured weapons from the defeated Portuguese which they then reverse engineered and mass produced in China such as matchlocks,  muskets and arquebuses, which they named bird guns and breech loading swivel guns which they named Folangji (Frankish) cannon because the Portuguese were known to the Chinese under the name of Franks at this time. 

The Portuguese later returned to Tamão and the islands of Sanchuão and Lampacau to carry out their lucrative commercial transactions. They even began to establish trade relations with the Chinese from the port of Hou-Quiang (Macau). They presented themselves as Portuguese instead of Franks in the Luso-Chinese agreement (1554) and rented Macau as a trading post from China by paying annual lease of hundreds of silver taels to Ming China.

Founding of Macau
The use of Macau as a commercial port dates back to 1535 during the Ming dynasty, when local authorities established a custom house, collecting 20,000 taels in annual custom duties. Sources also call this payment a rent or bribe. In 1554, the custom house was moved to Lampacao, likely due to threats of piracy. After the Portuguese helped the Chinese defeat the pirates, they were allowed to settle in Macau. By 1557, they established a permanent settlement, paying an annual ground rent of 500 taels. 

The name of Macau seems to have originated in one of the first places accessed by the Portuguese, the Bay of A-Má (in Cantonese, "A-Ma Gao"), a name that is due to the existence in this bay of a temple in honor of the goddess A -Ma. A-Ma Gao would become, Amacao, Macao and, finally, Macau.

At the time, the Portuguese commercial establishment of Macau was only a small village with a few blocks, churches and residences, joined by a small number of streets. Most of the population lived on trade, so many of them left Macao for months and sometimes even years to carry out their lucrative trade. At that time, it had a vaguely defined political-administrative organization, as the Portuguese Crown had not yet carried out any proper planning for Macau. Therefore, at that time, the Captain-Major of the Voyage of China and Japan was responsible for the affairs of the Portuguese during his stay in Macau. He, as the only existing authority, sought to maintain order among the Portuguese while his great merchant ship was in port.

Over time, issues emerged whose resolution could not wait for the Captain-Major's return from his trips to Japan, so a kind of triumvirate was formed, which began to direct the administration of the establishment. It was composed of three representatives of the residents, called homens-bons ("good men"), chosen by vote. In 1562, one of those elected became, by choice, Land Captain. These three representatives continued to be nevertheless dependent on the Captain-Major. Specifically, the function of these three representatives was to regulate all matters of public order and politics. In addition to the triumvirate, there was also a judge, and four merchants elected by the people who participated in the administration. These elements together formed a kind of council.

Although the Portuguese remained in Macau, the Chinese authorities maintained that Macau was an integral part of the Chinese Celestial Empire, so the Portuguese had been obligated to pay annual rent (about 500 taels of silver) and certain taxes to the Chinese, since the year 1573. The governor of Canton, the highest Chinese authority in the region, ordered some mandarins in the vicinity of Macau to watch and supervise that Portuguese commercial establishment, namely with regard to the collection of rent and taxes levied by the Guangzhou authorities on all Chinese products and on all products exported by the Portuguese. These Chinese officials exercised great influence over the administration of Macau and also exercised control and ultimate jurisdiction over all Chinese residents in Macau. Many of them lived in the north of the peninsula.

In 1573 or 1574, the Chinese authorities ordered the construction of a barrier on the northern border of the Peninsula, in a place very close to where today is the current "Frontier Post of Portas do Cerco", to prevent the expansion of the Portuguese through the island of Xiangshan (modern Zhongshan), to better supervise the collection of taxes on goods entering or leaving the city and to control Macau's supply.

Catholic Church in early Portuguese Macau

Macau also became an important point of departure for Catholic missionaries to different countries in Asia, namely China and Japan. In addition to evangelization, these missionaries, especially the Jesuits, also promoted ethical, cultural and scientific exchange between the West and the East; and contributed in an important way to the development of Macao. Belchior Carneiro Leitão, the first Governor of the Bishopric of Macau, founded, in 1569, the first hospital in Macau, Hospital dos Pobres (later to be called "Hospital de São Rafael"), and the first European institution charity in this region, the Santa Casa da Misericórdia. These Catholic religious also contributed to the development of social assistance, creating orphanages and even a leprosy, and education in Macau.

The Colégio de São Paulo was founded in the 16th century and the Seminary of São José in the 18th century. These two institutions had the function of training missionaries and priests. Due to the great importance of Macau, Pope Gregory XIII created the Diocese of Macau on January 23, 1576. The seminary, due to the lack of priestly vocations, was closed and the College was destroyed by fire in 1835.

On several occasions, the Jesuits who regularly attended the Court in Peking used their influence to save Macau from various dangers and from various exaggerated demands imposed by the Chinese authorities in Canton or by the Emperor himself.

Goa-Macau-Nagasaki trade

From its founding until the loss of trade with Japan in 1639, Macau survived and prospered due to the China-Macao-Japan triangular trade. This lucrative trade, based on the exchange of silk and gold from China for silver from Japan, began when, in the 1540s Portuguese merchants began selling Chinese products in Japan. Within just a decade, Macau became a key entrepot and intermediary in trade between China and Japan, especially after Chinese authorities banned direct trade with Japan for over a hundred years. In these circumstances, the Portuguese gained a monopoly over trade between China, Japan and Europe.

From 1550 onwards, this commercial monopoly was exercised and ensured by the Captain-Mor of the Voyage of China and Japan (or, simply, called Captain-Mor of the Voyage of Japan) and he also enjoyed the right to sell his post to others.

Macau during the Iberian Union

In 1580, the position of ouvidor ("ombundsman") was created. The first magistrate was sent from Lisbon to Macau, under the pretext of putting an end to the rivalries existing in the settlement. In 1581, the residents of Macau learned of the accession of Philip II of Spain to the throne of Portugal, which took place in the year 1580. This news saddened the citizens of Macau because it placed Macau in a dangerous situation, as the Chinese authorities had granted Macau to the Portuguese Crown and not to the Spanish. The Portuguese feared that they would be expelled by the Chinese authorities, losing their monopoly on trade with China. It was mainly for this reason, but also for the patriotic spirit of the Portuguese residents, that the Portuguese flag remained always hoisted during this period.

The new state of affairs in Portugal had the effect of establishing a more organized, effective and representative administration. In 1583, on the initiative of the Bishop of Macau, the Leal Senado, a municipal and senatorial body more representative than the oligarchic Junta, was founded to better administer Macau and to maintain Macau's autonomy from the Spanish authorities. The Senate, which feared the interference of Chinese authorities in the administration, the economy (mainly in commerce) or even in the statute or in the very existence of Macau, prepared large sums of gifts for the Chinese authorities, with the intention of trying to distance them from Macao's internal affairs. This situation of subservience on the part of Macau would only be overcome with the measures imposed during the mandate of Governor João Ferreira do Amaral (1846–1849), although Macau continued to depend on China.

Due to the growing prosperity and importance of Macau, this commercial establishment was elevated to the status of city in 1586 or 1587, by decision of King Filipe II of Spain (Filipe I of Portugal), changing its name to Cidade do Santo Nome De Deus de Macao. This Spanish monarch did not intend to send a Governor to the city, preferring to keep things as they were.

It was during the period of Habsburg control of Portugal that Macau reached great prosperity, entering its "golden age". Some historians point to the period between 1595 and 1602 as the height of its "golden age". In this period, Macau became one of the busiest commercial cities in the Far East and served as an entrepot for many Portuguese and Spanish trade routes, mainly for the lucrative route to Japan. At that time, the Portuguese, although increasingly dependent on the capital of the great Chinese and Japanese merchants and also suffering from increasing Dutch competition, had exclusivity on this route because Japan did not allow the entry of other foreign ships. This route, especially when the Dutch began to disturb the routes to Goa and Malacca, became one of the main sources of income for Macau and provided a key support to Portuguese trade in the China Seas.

It was during this period that the Church of São Paulo and many other architectural works, built mostly according to European-inspired architectural styles, were completed, giving a strong touch of splendor and grandeur to the city.

During this period, the Leal Senado was able to avoid open conflicts with the mandarins, bribing them with significant sums, and compromises with the Spaniards, who wanted to end the commercial monopoly that the Portuguese enjoyed in China (at that time, Portuguese ships, when entering Canton, paid two-thirds less than other ships of the same tonnage).

The Spaniards, based in Manila, even sent embassies to China and Japan, in an attempt to end the privileged position of the Portuguese, but they did not achieve what they sought, partially due to the pro-Portuguese actions of the Jesuits based in those Asian countries. In fact, the Jesuits were at the service of the Portuguese Empire at that time, within the scope of the Portuguese Padroado agreement.

Portuguese-Spanish relations were characterized more by distrust and rivalry than by cooperation and unity. For example, in 1589, the establishment of a Macau-Acapulco trade route greatly angered the Spaniards of Manila. In another example, some Spaniards even wanted the King of Spain (and Portugal) to order the destruction of Macau, transferring the silver and silk trade between Japan and China to Manila; this proposal was not, however, put into practice.

Alongside this, trade between Macau and Manila grew and was gradually regulated, also becoming an important source of income for the City of the Name of God.

Attempted Dutch takeover

Having an important strategic position, Macau was attacked several times by the Dutch (enemies of Spain and Portugal due to the union of these two countries between 1580 and 1640), who were envious of the monopoly the Portuguese enjoyed and wanted to control trade between Europe and the Far East.

King Philip III of Spain, who was at war with the Dutch, put an embargo on Dutch trading ships in all his territories including Portugal, so these ships headed east, causing many problems for the Portuguese settled in this region. In 1601, a Dutch fleet led by Admiral Van Neck appeared in Macau. In 1603, warships from Holland bombarded the city; and in the years 1604 and 1607 came, respectively, the expeditions led by Admirals Wybrand van Warwijck and Cornelis Matelieff de Jonge.

These Dutch invasion attempts forced the Portuguese authorities to build a defensive system for the city. But the Chinese authorities through threats prevented the fortification of Macau at all costs, fearing a possible coup against China. In 1614, the Emperor, through a decree, sanctioned the construction of fortifications in Macau. The Portuguese managed to build their desired and necessary fortifications, thanks to the magnificent gifts offered to the mandarins in charge of watching the city.

The most famous Dutch invasion took place on June 22, 1622, when 800 soldiers landed on Cacilhas beach. They advanced cautiously towards the center of the city, suffering heavy bombardment from cannons at the Fortaleza do Monte. After two days of fighting, on the 24th of June, a Jesuit priest fired a cannon shot and accurately hit a wagon loaded with gunpowder belonging to the Dutch, disconcerting the invading forces. It is also on this day that Macau's small military garrison (consisting of approximately 200 soldiers and a few fortresses, namely Fortaleza do Monte and Fortaleza da Guia) defeated the invading forces. The Dutch, defeated, threw themselves overboard in an attempt to reach the boats. Many drowned and one of the boats, overcrowded, sank. Portuguese records say that a few dozen Portuguese died and that around 350 Dutch died in combat or drowned. For Macau, unprepared, the victory was considered a miracle. After the victory, Macao residents celebrated the 24th of June, Victory Day, as City Day. It is also on this day that Saint John the Baptist, the patron saint of the city, is celebrated. Legend has it that by his cloak, the enemy's shots were deflected, saving the city from the Dutch invaders. This day was a public holiday and celebrated every year with great parties and joy until 1999, the date when Macau's sovereignty was transferred to China. After the transfer, this day was no longer a public holiday and was virtually forgotten.

After this attempted Dutch invasion, the Portuguese authorities, from 1623 onwards, sent a Governor to Macau. Before his arrival, this small town was administered and governed by the Loyal Senate. Macau's small military garrison was also reinforced. These measures revealed a greater concern and participation of the Portuguese authorities in the administration and protection of this distant and small Portuguese establishment. But, even so, the local power, residing in the Leal Senado, continued to maintain a great autonomy in relation to the central metropolitan power of Lisbon, represented in Macau by the Governor, and continued to play a fundamental role in the administration of the city. That's why the Loyal Senate and the Governor often came into conflict over disagreements.

Title awarded by King John IV

Although Portugal was ruled by a Spanish monarch between 1580 and 1640, Macau continued to loyally hoist the Portuguese flag. Therefore, after the restoration of Portugal's independence and sovereignty in 1640, King John IV of Portugal rewarded this trust and loyalty in 1654, by granting Macau the title "No other is more loyal". Therefore the full name and title of Macau under Portuguese administration would read: "City of the Holy Name of God of Macau – No Other is More Loyal".

Competition with European powers
From the mid-17th century onwards, Macao's prosperity began to decline, caused by various factors and events. But, even so, this commercial establishment rarely asked for subsidies from its metropolis (Portugal), and even sometimes gave financial aid to other Portuguese territories in the East. When Macau had financial problems, which it did with some frequency, the city would ask for loans from other neighboring countries or from wealthy merchants in the Far East.

The Portuguese commercial system centered in Lisbon began to suffer a growing decline in the 17th century, due to the competition between it and the other systems developed by other European powers, namely England and the Netherlands. These European powers, with large and powerful fleets of merchant and warships, attacked the great but weakened Portuguese Empire, occupying and/or looting its colonies and trading bases and intercepting many of its trade routes. In the end, these emerging powers created, at the expense of the Portuguese Empire, their own empires and secured many markets and trade routes that were once dominated exclusively by the Portuguese.

Loss of Malacca and end of trade with Japan and Manila

The profitable trade with Japan began to undergo gradual changes as early as the end of the 16th century. In 1587, Japanese authorities began to implement measures to expel Catholic missionaries, who had become increasingly powerful and influential in the Kyushu region. This led to their loss of control over Nagasaki. This event, combined with the prohibition of Christianity by the Japanese authorities in 1614, contributed to the fact that Portuguese trade in Japan was conducted with increasing difficulties. In 1636, the Portuguese were transferred from Nagasaki to the secondary trading port of Dejima.

In 1638–1639, the shogun Tokugawa Iemitsu implemented Japan's exclusionary policies, intended to protect it from possible European occupation, and ruthlessly ordered the persecution of all missionaries and priests, and of hundreds of thousands of Japanese Christians. As a result, Portuguese trade with Japan came to an abrupt end, seriously affecting Macau, which quickly went into economic decline. The Dutch also contributed to the end of this lucrative trade, making the Japanese authorities increasingly suspicious of the commercial activity of the Portuguese and especially of the religious activity of Catholic missionaries, accused of being the vanguard of a powerful European and Catholic invading force. With the Portuguese expelled, a small number of Dutch, who gained the trust of the Japanese authorities, were able to visit the port of Dejima, although with many restrictions, becoming the only Europeans who were allowed to trade with Japan.

In 1640, in an attempt to reestablish the profitable and important trade, the Portuguese residents of Macau decided to send an embassy to Japan but not only did they not getting what they wanted, the members of the embassy were all executed, by order of the powerful Tokugawa shogun.

In 1641, another event affected Macau's declining economy: the Portuguese lost Malacca to the Dutch, who had already captured several Portuguese possessions, areas of influence and trade routes. The loss of this important city and commercial base caused disturbances and deviations from the usual route between Macau and Goa and a decrease in the supply of tradable products with China.

In 1640, when the Crowns of Portugal and Spain were once again separated, trade with Manila and with the Spaniards based there ended, causing more economic and financial problems for Macau. It was only with the end of the Portuguese-Spanish rivalry that trade was reactivated.

Growing instability in China

The loss of several commercial markets, although very harmful to Macau, was not fatal for the merchants and inhabitants of the city. The transition from the Chinese Ming dynasty to the Manchu Qing dynasty, which lasted several years, caused strong instability in the Chinese Empire and made the internal markets of China and all of Southeast Asia uncertain, fatally affecting the commercial activity of the residents of Macau. In addition to living in uncertainty and fear of being destroyed or occupied by the forces of the new imperial dynasty, the city was also flooded in the 1640s with refugees fleeing the Qings, depleting Macao's resources and giving rise to famine in the 1640s, also due to the dwindling and unstable food supply from Chinese merchants.

It was only with the re-establishment of imperial peace in southeastern China that Macau's trade prospered again. The Portuguese, not wanting Macau's status to be changed by the new imperial Qing dynasty and not wanting their privileged position to end, sent several embassies to Beijing, establishing friendly diplomatic relations with China's new sovereigns.

The end of the Portuguese monopoly on trade with China

In 1685, despite successive Portuguese embassies to Beijing, the Portuguese monopoly on trade with China came to an end because the Chinese Emperor authorized trade with all foreign countries in Canton, at least once a year during the annual fair. This ended the privileged position of the Portuguese in trade with the Chinese Empire, as the only and exclusive intermediaries in the China-Europe trade.

From that date onwards, Macau ceased to be the exclusive entrepôt for Chinese trade, thus altering Macau's economic role in trade with China. However, European merchants of other nationalities, who were also able to participate in direct trade with China along with the Portuguese, also started to temporarily visit and use Macau as a trading post and intermediary in this lucrative trade. This is because, at that time, foreigners could not reside and move freely in Guangzhou, and they had to reside in Macau for most of the year.

With the sudden increase in foreign competition in trade with China and the decline of the Portuguese trading system, merchants based in Macau, in order to continue with their commercial activities and with their profits, had to cooperate more frequently with the merchants of the new and emerging European powers, because it was these powers that held control of world trade centered on Europe. This cooperation at times generated a certain dependence on the part of Macanese merchants on these new western powers.

The rise of intra-Asian trade (17th–18th centuries)

With the loss of trade with Japan, Manila and other locations that were once Portuguese possessions and with the rise of Dutch and later English merchants in the eastern seas, Portuguese traders based in Macau made several adjustments to their trade routes.

Knowing the process of decline of the Portuguese world trading system and the lack of resources on the part of Portugal to sustain an intense long-distance trade (that is, commercial voyages from the East to Europe), Macanese merchants bet heavily on intra-Asian trade, while long-distance trade was mostly dominated by the new European powers, such as the Netherlands and England.

These Macau-based traders invested, in addition to Goa and China, in several Asian regional markets, such as Macassar, Solor, Flores, Timor, Vietnam, Kingdom of Siam, Bengal, Calcutta, Banjarmasin and Batavia.

Over time, the diverse and almost constant adaptations to the changing political and economic realities of the different Asian regional markets bore fruit. In the 18th century, intra-Asian trade became sufficient to create a new and true proto-capitalist class of entrepreneurs, both Portuguese and Chinese, based in Macau. This emerging class specifically included Chinese buyers and the main shipowners and trade captains who accepted the high risk of sailing in the eastern seas and who knew how to adapt to the new realities of the region.

But even so, this intra-Asian trade never managed to restore the prosperity experienced in Macau that was provided by trade with Japan. Often, mainly due to the policies of the Chinese authorities that were unfavorable to the interests of the Portuguese in Macau, such as the opening of certain Chinese ports to international trade, this intra-Asian trade was unable to fully contribute to the subsistence of the territory. Macanese authorities, often had to ask for large loans from other neighboring countries or from wealthy merchants in the Far East.

The Solor-Timor-Macau trade, based essentially on the supply of the valuable and much sought after sandalwood to Chinese markets, prospered in the 16th century, when trade with Japan was already conducted with many and great difficulties. This aromatic wood, much sought after in China, was transported from Timor and Solor to Macau, where it was later sold in Canton. This trade, although under great danger and intense pressure from the powerful Dutch, made huge profits, which could be above 100% to 150%. Therefore, in that difficult period for Macau, the sandalwood trade became one of the main sources of income for the authorities of the City of the Holy Name of God. But with the fortress of Solor besieged in 1636 by the Dutch, the merchant ships from Macau that participated in the profitable sandalwood trade began to head only to Timor, still under the jurisdiction of Goa. This island supplied slaves, honey and horses, as well as sandalwood. But in the mid-18th century, Macau, which was Timor's main trading partner, abandoned trade with this island, mainly due to interminable internal revolts. Trade with Timor was only reactivated with the pacification of the island.

Macau-Macassar trade, while not as profitable as the sandalwood trade, relied on Macassar's spice trade in exchange for Chinese roots and cotton goods. This trade prospered after the fall of Malacca in 1641 and, according to Charles Ralph Boxer, grew to such an extent that it threatened the Dutch spice trade in the East. But with Macassar attacked and captured by a Dutch fleet in the 1660s, this trade had to end. With the end of the Portuguese-Dutch rivalry, trade was reactivated.

The Vietnam-Macao trade: Even before the decline of Portuguese trade with Japan, Portuguese traders were already making commercial trips to Tonkin and Cochinchina (now Vietnam), although these had been considered as operations of secondary importance that served mainly to support the Jesuit mission. But due to the Jesuit influence in the royal courts of these countries, trade was stimulated, mainly in the exchange of silver for Chinese silk. It was only with wars and political instability in Vietnam in the late 18th century that trade ceased.

The Batavia-Macau trade: In the late 17th century, with the Portuguese-Dutch rivalry over for some time, Portuguese traders, lacking markets, began to cooperate with the Dutch East India Company, trading with Batavia (located in Java). At that time, commercial activity with this Dutch colony was mainly based on the shipment of blue and white porcelain produced in southern China by Portuguese and Chinese merchants from Macau. Trade with Batavia intensified particularly in the period from 1717 to 1727, when the Chinese authorities banned foreign trade. The Dutch, who used to buy Chinese tea in Canton, now did so exclusively in Macau. During this period, tea was transported by Chinese merchants to Macau by reeds.

The Banjarmasin-Macau trade, based on the transport of pepper to Macao from Borneo, prospered for a short time in the late 17th century, but also ended abruptly two years after the trade started, due to an attempted massacre of the Portuguese.

The Bengal-Macau and Calcutta-Macau trade. In the late 18th century, Macao traders also began to participate in the opium trade between Bengal and China. They also engaged heavily in trade with Calcutta, where Portuguese traders traded spices, cotton, and opium, in exchange for Chinese silk, tea, and porcelain. This intense commercial activity with these colonies of the British Empire was not a competition between the merchants based in Macau and the English East India Company. On the contrary, they cooperated with this powerful English commercial company to obtain the desired profits.

Influence of the Chinese on Macau

In addition to Chinese taxes, the rent, the Portas do Cerco, the special status of the Chinese of being judged, in the last instance, by the mandarins, according to the law of the Chinese Empire, and the increasing Chinese supervision over Macau, the Chinese authorities also imposed a ban, except in exceptional cases, on the construction of dwellings by the Portuguese beyond the walls of the City of Macau. Since they could not expand the city to the north of the Macau Peninsula, and the city could not have a very significant population increase. They, going further, also imposed that the construction of new houses and fortifications within the City had to be previously authorized by the mandarins in charge of guarding the city.

The Chinese authorities even ordered, in 1648, the establish ment of a military post with 500 soldiers in the village of Qianshan (which the Portuguese called Casa Branca), very close to Portas do Cerco, to guard the "City of the Holy Name of God of Macau". This village was also the home of one of the mandarins in charge of supervising Macau.

On several occasions, the impositions and decisions by the Chinese authorities to sanction Macau caused a large exodus of the Chinese community from Macau. For this reason, during the first centuries of Macau's existence, the number of the Chinese population was uncertain and fluctuated considerably. These impositions and requirements, sometimes very abusive, sometimes brought real financial crises to the Macao authorities.

The restrictions and impositions  by the Chinese authorities began to intensify more and more when the Qing became the rulers of China, as they were always suspicious of foreign actions and influence.

Three years after the opening of the port of Guangzhou to all foreign merchants, in 1688, the Chinese authorities established a Chinese customs house, the "Ho-pu", supervised by a mandarin to better oversee the collection of taxes on certain goods transported by merchant ships anchored in the port of Macau and above all to control the access of foreign ships long-distance to Canton. The Ho-pu became the symbol of Chinese authority, power and influence in Macau.

In 1736, the Chinese authorities, increasingly abusing their power and the Macanese, imposed a local mandarin in Macau with the name "tchó-t'óng" (or Tso-tang ), under the pretext of helping the mandarins in charge of supervising Macau and of better dealing with the affairs of the Chinese inhabitants of the city. This mandarin, residing in the north of the Macau Peninsula, only began to exercise full authority from 1797 onwards.

The power of the mandarins over Macau would be drastically reduced only in the 19th century, during the mandate of Macau Governor João Ferreira do Amaral.

Macau as a European outpost in China

Europeans such as the British, Dutch, French, Spanish, Danish and Swedes, who had been involved in trade with China for some time, began to form small but wealthy communities in Macau, due to the lifting of restrictions on trade and residence to foreigners by the Macau authorities in the year 1760. After the exemptions, Macau emerged as the mandatory residence or intermediate stop for all foreigners participating in trade with China through Canton. This caused many European commercial companies to establish themselves in Macau, increasing the city's revenue. In conclusion, Macau thus became Europe's outpost in China. The city prospered with this status and this is also reflected in its urban landscape: new and sometimes exquisite buildings, built according to European-inspired architectural styles, began to appear in Macau, namely in Praia Grande. These buildings included the residences of wealthy merchants and European aristocracy.

In fact, at this time, the Macao authorities, which formerly depended mainly on taxes paid by Portuguese traders, now also depended on taxes paid by these wealthy European merchants. To further increase these revenues, the Macau authorities, in 1784, also created their own customs machine, charging customs duties on imported goods and on the anchoring of ships. But most of the revenue from this new customs system was sent to Portugal's state coffers.

The balance of power between the Governor and the Loyal Senate

The Leal Senado, symbol of authority and local power, enjoyed great autonomy from the governments of Lisbon and Goa and was Macau's most important governing body for more than two centuries, from its foundation until 1783. The Senate has already suffered a significant decrease due to the increasing and abusive restrictions and impositions of the Chinese authorities, it was the internal reform carried out during the reign of Queen Maria I of Portugal that restricted the powers and especially the autonomy of the Senate.

In 1783, through royal measures, the Queen granted the Governor of Macau fundamental powers and the right of veto over the decisions of the Senate. The governor had the obligation and responsibility to veto all decisions that were contrary to regulations, laws or orders from Lisbon or Goa. The measures dictated that the governor, with his powers already expanded and fortified, had to intervene in all matters related to the administration and government of Macau. Prior to the enactment of these measures, the governor was only the commander of the Portuguese military forces in Macau and did not participate much, with a few exceptions, in the administration of the city.

If, by chance, these two governing bodies could not reach agreement on a matter, and if the case was urgent, the Bishop of Macau and (Portuguese) citizens with the right to vote were to meet and resolve by a majority of votes. In conclusion, from 1783 onwards, the power between the governor and the Loyal Senate reached an equilibrium.

Peninsular War and Battle of the Bocca Tigris

During the Peninsular War (1807–1814), in September 1808 Macau was occupied by troops from the expeditionary force under the command of Rear Admiral William O'Brien Drury, commander-in-chief of the British Naval Forces in the seas of Asia, under the pretext of protection against the French threat. This contingent was re-embarked at the end of the same year, due to the concentration of around 80,000 men of the Chinese army in front of the city gates.

In 1809, the famous naval battle of the Tigers Mouth (or Bocca Tigris) took place between a Portuguese flotilla of six ships and a Chinese pirate fleet with more than 300 ships. The Portuguese flotilla, outnumbered but with superior firepower provided by the artillery, emerged victorious and managed to maintain Portuguese rule in Macau, which at that time was seriously threatened by these pirates, who frequently attacked local merchant ships.

The rise of Hong Kong and the loss of Macau's economic importance
The prosperity and importance of the port of Macau was drastically reduced after the First Opium War in 1841, when Hong Kong became the most important western port in China. The vast majority of the members of the non-Portuguese European communities and even a group of Macanese and Portuguese, as well as the vast majority of European trading companies, seeing a good part of the trade carried out in Macau being transferred to Hong Kong, quickly abandoned the city and took up residence in the new and prosperous British colony, located 60 km from Macau.

Although Macau continued to house a class of merchants and buyers (mostly Chinese) and although commerce never ceased to exist in the City, Macau was no longer the outpost of Europe in China, and was relegated to a secondary economic and commercial level.

Portuguese authority consolidated 

In the 19th century, Portugal, seeing the already evident weakness of the Chinese Empire and growing British influence threatening the balance of the region, finally began to worry about strengthening Portuguese sovereignty in Macau and the definition of the political-administrative structures of the city to prevent Macau from falling into the hands of other European powers. This desire of Portugal was fulfilled on the 20th of September 1844, with the promulgation of a royal decree signed by Queen Maria II of Portugal. This document reaffirmed that the governor was the main political-administrative body of the city and not the Leal Senado, officially putting an end to local authority and hopes that the Senate would regain the status and prestige it had lost in 1834, and Macau finally joined the administrative organization of the Portuguese overseas territory, becoming an overseas province jointly with Timor and Solor, headquartered in Macau and with the name of "Province of Macau, Timor and Solor". Prior to this entry, Macau had been part of the Portuguese State of India.

After the Royal Decree of 1844, Portugal declared the City a free port in 1845, through a royal decree that would later be implemented by Governor João Ferreira do Amaral, appointed in 1846 with a mandate to assert Portuguese sovereignty. This led to a Chinese revolt which was put down by the Portuguese military.

The Governor even ordered the construction of a road to connect the walled city of Macau in the south of the peninsula, to the "Portas do Cerco", a border post located in the extreme north that separates the Macau Peninsula from continental China.

Amaral also ordered the expulsion of the mandarins (Chinese officials) from Macau and, because Macau was a free port (that is, a port without customs), he finally could order the abolition, in 1849, of the famous Ho-pu (Chinese customs), thus culminating the process of strengthening Portuguese sovereignty. From that date onwards, the Macau Government also began to exercise ultimate jurisdiction over all Chinese residents of Macau City and to levy taxes on them, ending their special status. In the implementation of the royal decree of 1845, the Portuguese customs also ceased to exist.

The Senate opposed his actions, stating that establishing full control by force was an "unfair and disloyal gesture". Amaral dissolved the Senate and called them unpatriotic. He told Chinese officials that they would be received as representatives of a foreign power. 

After the events of 1783, 1834, 1844, the definitive shake-up of the mandarins' power over Macau and the abolition of Chinese customs in 1849, the Governor of Macau, free from local and Chinese authorities, became Macau's highest authority.

Amaral's policies evoked much resentment, and he was assassinated by Chinese men on 22 August 1849. This led the Portuguese to capture the Passaleão fort beyond the Barrier Gate three days later.

The Passaleão

On 22 August, 1849, Governor João Ferreira do Amaral was assassinated near Portas do Cerco and the Chinese assassins cut off his head and right arm. This assassination, ordered, according to rumors, by the Viceroy of Canton, was followed by a military confrontation between the Portuguese and the Chinese imperial troops. The latter, shortly after the assassination, sought to gather in and around the Chinese fort of Pak-Shan-Lan or Baishaling (in Portuguese: Passaleão), which was located near the Portas do Cerco. According to the spies of the guards of the fortresses of Macau, there were about 500 soldiers in that fort and in the neighboring elevations more than 1500 men, with artillery.

On 25 August, 1849, a young Macanese second lieutenant, Vicente Nicolau de Mesquita, proposed to the Government Council (which replaced the Governor) to attack the Passaleão fort, whose garrison began bombarding with its 20 cannon the Portas do Cerco, at that time garrisoned by only 120 Portuguese soldiers and three pieces of artillery. The situation was unbearable and many residents of Macau predicted the end of Portuguese rule in Macau.

Mesquita, together with 32 soldiers supported by two pieces of field artillery and two cannons from a gunboat and a lorcha, began the attack on the fort, first bombarding it with an artillery piece that only fired once (since it broke down, after the first shot). The shot caused a panic among the Chinese troops. The panic of the Chinese soldiers was also related to an African landim soldier, who was the first to jump over the walls of the fort. Due to the confusion, Chinese troops from Passaleão and its vicinity withdrew. When the Portuguese returned victorious, they took with them, in an act of revenge, the head and hand of a mandarin who had offered resistance.

After the confrontation of Passaleão, the Tso-tang was transferred to Chinsan or Xiangshan (modern Zhongshan), a Chinese town neighboring Macau, with its power shaken. After several protests, insistence and delays, Amaral's head and right arm were delivered on January 16, 1850 and his remains transferred to Lisbon.

Both Mesquita and Ferreira do Amaral are remembered as heroes in Macau and Portugal. Later, Mesquita was promoted to Colonel. In 1871, the Government of Macau inaugurated the Arco das Portas do Cerco, with the aim of honoring the deeds of Governor Ferreira do Amaral and Colonel Mesquita.

Failed Treaty of Tianjin
During the second half of the 19th century, the main European powers humiliated the already weak Imperial Chinese Government of the Qing Dynasty, forcing it to sign the so-called Unequal Treaties. In these, the Chinese Government was obligated to open its commercial ports, to accept the European occupation of certain Chinese lands and to accept the division of China into European "areas of influence".

Perhaps taking advantage of the situation, on August 13, 1862, Governor  managed to get the Chinese government to sign a treaty in Tianjin (or Tientsin). This treaty, consisting of 54 articles, recognized that Macau was a Portuguese colony. But it was never ratified as the Governor and Minister Plenipotentiary at that time, José Rodrigues Coelho do Amaral, returned to Macao without ratifying it, protesting against the objections of the Chinese delegates regarding the interpretation of the ninth article. They defended that Macau could not be considered a Chinese territory, raising a bitter argument with Coelho do Amaral in May 1864, when he arrived in Tianjin to ratify the treaty.

Sino-Portuguese Treaty of Friendship and Commerce of 1887

It was only in 1887 that Portugal, which had wanted for many years to establish a treaty on Macau with China, managed to sign, with the diplomatic support of Great Britain, the "Sino-Portuguese Treaty of Friendship and Commerce", which recognized and legitimized the perpetual occupation of Macau and its dependencies by the Portuguese. This treaty, also called the "Sino-Portuguese Treaty of Peking", was signed by Sun Xuwen, the representative of China, and by Portuguese plenipotentiary minister Tomás de Sousa Rosa, who was assisted by Pedro Nolasco da Silva. The delimitation of borders was for later, through a future special convention.

Economy of Macau in late 19th century

The 1822 constitution included Macau as an integral part of its territory. A Portuguese royal decree on 20 November 1845 declared Macau a free port. In 1847, Governor Isidoro Francisco Guimarães, knowing that Macau did not have the capacity to compete with the nascent British colony of Hong Kong, decided to legalize gambling, including casinos and other types of games of chance. With this legalization of gambling, which already existed clandestinely in the city, the government wanted to transform the colony into a holiday, leisure and entertainment center for the inhabitants and wealthy merchants of the region. This sector, mainly due to the great taste of the Chinese for gambling, contributed a lot to the revival of the economy and the development of Macau. Currently, it remains the most important economic activity in the region.

In addition to gambling, Macau also managed to recover part of its former prosperity, serving as a warehouse for the coolies trade and for the lucrative tea trade. It was also at this time, in the second half of the 19th century, that Macau experienced an initial industrialization, due to the development of communication and transport infrastructures and the establishment of several factories and production units, namely the tea factories, matches factories, fireworks, tobacco and cement. But Macao's industry only began to experience great development and expansion from the 1870s onwards.

The coolie trade, which began in Macau in the late 1840s, consisted of supplying contract Chinese workers to countries that at that time needed labor, such as Cuba and Peru. They lived and worked in precarious conditions, resembling slaves. This trade, while providing new prosperity to the port of Macau, brought serious social problems to the City, such as corruption, moral depression and the need to deal with a large number of coolies repatriated or waiting to be transported to the their new place of work. Incidentally, although individual merchants in Macau also profited from this commercial activity, the greatest beneficiaries of this trade were foreign companies and their agents, whose capital dominated the trade. That's why the coolie trade came to an end in the late 1870s.
With the end of the tea and coolie trade, Macau went into decline again and the Macau Government, also due to its political and administrative responsibilities over Timor and Solor since 1844, had to look for new ways to obtain revenue. Timor was definitively separated from Macau's administrative structure in 1896, the Macau government also had to financially support the colony of Timor. The monopoly concession by the government to private companies entrusted by it then became one of the privileged ways of obtaining state revenue. This measure 
ensured the continuity of the stable and regular supply of revenues to the Government, since companies that held monopolies generally suffered little or no competition and were obliged, in addition to taxes, to pay a fixed annual amount to the Government, regardless of their revenues. In the 19th century, the most notable and important monopolies were the opium sector.

Mainly after the end of the tea and coolies trade, still in the 19th century, Macau's economy came to be supported largely by the gambling sector, fishing and the various monopolies granted by the government (namely that of opium). But trade did not cease to exist in Macau or cease to be important for the colony. The city has always been home to a class of buyers and traders, mostly Chinese, who maintained commercial relations with various locations in China and Southeast Asia, and who made a profit from their intermediary activity of importing products and then re-exporting them. Some of these activities, such as the import, sale and re-export of oil and gold, were even monopolized by the government,  whose monopoly rights were later granted to a private company.

Territorial expansion

In the first half of the 19th century, the Portuguese, who were previously only allowed to inhabit the south of the Macau Peninsula, also began to exercise jurisdiction over the north of the peninsula (at that time occupied by the Chinese). They even wanted to occupy land located beyond the Portas do Cerco, but they were unable to do so.

In 1847, Governor Ferreira do Amaral ordered the construction of a fortress on the island of Taipa, designed to protect the Chinese inhabitants and traders from pirates and also to assert the Portuguese presence on the island. In 1851, the Portuguese took control of all of Taipa. The occupation of the island of Coloane began in 1864. When the Portuguese arrived on the islands of Taipa and Coloane, Chinese pirates had great influence on them and terrorized their inhabitants. The Portuguese had to fight them, with one of the most famous clashes taking place in Coloane in 1910, where the Portuguese were victorious.

In 1890, the Portuguese officially occupied Ilha Verde, which was located 1 kilometer west of the Macau Peninsula. Due to landfills, this island was completely absorbed by the Peninsula in 1923.

In the 19th century, the Portuguese also began to expand their influence to the islands of Lapa, Dom João and Montanha (adjacent to Macau), offering protection and services (eg education) to the few Chinese residents there in exchange for taxes. At the time, these three islands were already inhabited by Portuguese missionaries, with the island of Lapa already inhabited at the end of the 17th century. They were officially occupied by the Portuguese in 1938, under the pretext of protecting the Portuguese and missionaries residing there. But in the oWorld War II, the Portuguese were expelled in 1941 by the Imperial Japanese Army (no armed struggle or deaths were recorded) which constantly launched threats to the government of Macau. After the expulsion of the Portuguese, the Japanese began to occupy these islands. At the end of the Great War, with the defeat of Japan, the Portuguese were unable to reoccupy the islands of Lapa, D. João and Montanha, which were returned to China.

At the beginning of the 20th century, after the various annexations, the Colony of Macau (excluding Lapa, D. João, Montanha and certain nearby islands over which the Portuguese claimed sovereignty) had approximately an area of 11.6 Km2, distributed as follows: Peninsula Macau, including Ilha Verde (3.4 Km2); Taipa (2.3 Km2); and Coloane (5.9 Km2).

Macau, not very satisfied with the annexations carried out, carried out a series of landfill works that continue today. In the 1990s, a series of landfill works were carried out on the narrow and small Taipa-Coloane isthmus, giving rise to the Landfill Zone of COTAI.

These works more than doublec the area of ​​Macao, and currently the area of ​​the Special Administrative Region of Macao (SAR) is 28.6 Km2, distributed as follows: Peninsula of Macao (9.3 Km2), Taipa (6.5 Km2), Coloane (7.6 Km2) and COTAI Landfill Zone (5.2 Km2).

19th century on

On 26 March 1887, the Lisbon Protocol was signed, in which China recognised the "perpetual occupation and government of Macao" by Portugal who in turn, agreed never to surrender Macau to a third party without Chinese agreement. This was reaffirmed in the Treaty of Peking on 1 December. A growing nationalist movement in China voiced disapproval of the treaty and questioned its validity. Although the Nationalist (Kuomintang) government in China vowed to abrogate the "unequal treaties", Macau's status remained unchanged. 

The 1928 Sino-Portuguese Treaty of Friendship and Trade reaffirmed Portuguese administration over Macau.

Second World War
Macau's population doubled during World War II (1939–1945) due to the influx of people fleeing the Japanese occupation of Southeast Asia. The main origin of the refugees was from neighboring cities such as Canton and Hong Kong. Japan respected the neutrality of Portugal.

Even though the Japanese had no intention of occupying Macau, they soon established a powerful consulate in the city. In addition to its diplomatic functions,  it also served as a center for espionage and the detention of anti-Japanese Chinese figures, many of whom had fled China for Macao. The Japanese, occupying all neighboring lands of Macau (including Hong Kong), were able to supervise the political and administrative activity of Macau, through their consul, Fukui Yasumitsu, who was elevated to the status of special adviser to the Governor of Macau. Still, there was strong tension between the Macau Government and the Japanese Army. The Portuguese feared the invasion of Macau by Japanese troops because the military
garrison did not have the capacity to defend the Portuguese colony. The action of Governor Gabriel Maurício Teixeira and Pedro José Lobo, at the time head or director of the Central Office of Economic Services, was crucial for Macau to remain relatively intact during the War.

Despite Macau's neutrality, the seaplane port existing at the time was bombed, an.alleged accident, and the islands of Lapa, Dom João and Montanha were occupied by the Japanese Army. The consequences of the Second World War in Macau were limited to overpopulation and the lack of imported goods, of which food was the most urgent, and caused thousands of deaths. After World War II, Macau's population began to decline due to the return of many Chinese refugees to their homeland.

However, in 1946, Gabriel Maurício Teixeira was removed from Macau and, later, dismissed as Governor of Macau, due to strong pressure exerted by the Chinese authorities, who accused him of having collaborated with the Japanese during the Second World War.

1945–1974
In 1945, after the end of extraterritorial rights in China, the Nationalists called for the liquidation of foreign control over Hong Kong and Macau, but they were too preoccupied in the civil war with the Communists to fulfil their goals.The 12-3 incident occurred in 1966, when demonstrations against Portuguese rule were held.

From the Carnation Revolution until 1999
After the 1974 revolution in Portugal, a decolonisation policy paved the way for Macau's retrocession to the People's Republic of China (PRC). Portugal offered to withdraw from Macau in late 1974, but China declined in favour of a later time because it sought to preserve international and local confidence in Hong Kong, which was still under British rule. In January 1975, Portugal recognised the mainland's PRC instead of rump ROC in Taiwan as the sole government of China. On 17 February 1976, the Portuguese parliament passed the Organic Statute of Macau, which called it a "territory under Portuguese administration". This term was also put in Portugal's 1976 constitution, replacing Macau's designation as an overseas province. Unlike previous constitutions, Macau was not included as an integral part of Portuguese territory. The 1987 Sino-Portuguese Joint Declaration called Macau a "Chinese territory under Portuguese administration".

The transfer of sovereignty

The granting of full sovereignty to the People's Republic of China was transferred in a ceremony on 20 December 1999.

The transfer of Macau's sovereignty between Portugal and China took place in the early hours of the morning of December 20, 1999, as foreseen in the Joint Declaration, after many years of negotiations and preparations.
It was two years after Hong Kong's transfer of sovereignty; Macau had a smoother process than Hong Kong's, with no notable political clashes between the two governments during diplomatic negotiations, nor social unrest, unlike in Hong Kong, whose population has a more demanding and participatory tradition.

Government 

Since 1657, the office of Captain-Major was awarded by the King of Portugal or on his behalf by the Viceroy of India to any fidalgo (nobleman) or gentleman who excelled in services to the Crown. The Captain-Major was head of the fleets and emporia from Malacca to Japan, and the official representative of Portugal to Japan and China. Since he was often away from Macau for long periods, an embryonic municipal government formed in 1560 to resolve matters. Three representatives chosen by vote held the title of eleitos (elected) and could perform administrative and judicial duties.

By 1583, the Senate Council was formed, later called the Loyal Senate (Leal Senado). It consisted of three aldermen, two judges, and one city procurator. Portuguese citizens in Macau elected six electors who would then select the senators. The most serious issues were dealt with by convening the General Council of Ecclesiastic Authorities and leading citizens to decide what measures should be taken. After several Dutch invasions, the Senate created the post of War Governor in 1615 to establish a permanent presence of a military commander. In 1623, the Viceroy created the office of Governor and Captain-General of Macau, replacing the Captain-Major's authority over the territory.

Macau was originally administered as part of Xiangshan County, Guangdong. Chinese and Portuguese officials discussed affairs in casa da câmara, or the city hall, where the Leal Senado Building was later built. In 1731, the Chinese set up an assistant magistrate (xian cheng) in Qian Shan Zhai to manage affairs in Macau. In 1743, he was later based in Mong Ha village (Wang Xia), now part of Our Lady of Fátima, Macau. In 1744, the Chinese formed the Macau Coast Military and Civilian Government headed by a subprefect (tongzhi) based in Qian Shan Zhai.

Sovereignty 

Sovereignty over Macau has been a complex issue. Professor of Sociology Zhidong Hao of the University of Macau said that some consider sovereignty to be "absolute" and cannot be shared, while others say it is "relative" and can be joint or shared. He stated:

The complexity of the sovereignty question in Macau suggests that the Chinese and Portuguese shared Macau's sovereignty before 1999. [...] In the colonial period of Macau, China had the lesser control in Macau, therefore the lesser sovereignty, and Portugal had more of it. On the other hand, if the Portuguese had sovereignty over Macau, even after the 1887 treaty, it was never absolute either. So sovereignty in fact had been shared between China and Portugal in one way or another, with one party having more at one time than the other.
Macau's political status was still disputed after the 1887 treaty, due to the treaty's ambiguous wording. The interpretation depends on the perspective of the writer, with the Portuguese and Chinese taking different sides. Scholar Paulo Cardinal, who has been a legal advisor to the Legislative Assembly of Macau, wrote:

On an international law level of analysis, Macau has been characterized by western scholars as a territory on a lease; a union community with Portugal enshrined in and by the Chief of State; a condominium; a territory under an internationalized regime; a territory under a special situation; an autonomous territory without integration connected to a special international situation; and a dependent community subjected to a dual distribution of sovereignty powers (in other words, China held the sovereignty right but Portugal was responsible for its exercise). Without a doubt, it was an atypical situation. Since the Joint Declaration, Macau was, until 19 December 1999, an internationalized territory by international law standards, despite the absence of such a label in the treaty itself.

Education 
In 1594, the Jesuits opened St. Paul's College, the first Western-style university in the East. 

In 1728, St. Joseph's Seminary and Church was founded and provided an academic curriculum equivalent to a Western university. 

In 1893, Liceu de Macau was opened, the only public Portuguese language school. Official teaching in Portuguese underwent reforms after the Portuguese revolution of 1911, and education in Macau experienced a great development. The education promoted by the Church, despite continuing with government support, evolved into private education and the private teaching in Chinese was moved from private home classes to state schools.

According to the 1921 Yearbook, public education in Macau covered 125 secondary and primary schools, of which 2 official schools (Macao Liceu and Commercial School), 7 schools subsidized by the Government, 10 municipal schools and 4 Church schools, with a total number of 5477 students.

In 1928, the Yuet Wah College was moved from Canton to Macau. During the Japanese invasion of China in 1937, other private educational institutions closed their doors in mainland China and also moved to Macau.

Gallery

Portuguese architecture

Currency

Vexilollogy

Heraldry

See also 
 Arquivo Histórico Ultramarino, archives in Lisbon documenting the Portuguese Empire, including Macau
 British Hong Kong (1841–1997)
 British Weihaiwei (1898–1930)
 China–Portugal relations
 Leased Territory of Guangzhouwan (1898–1945), French leased territory in China, administered as a part of Indochina
 Military of Macau under Portuguese rule
 Portuguese Empire

References

Bibliography 
Cardinal, Paulo (2009). "The Judicial Guarantees of Fundamental Rights in the Macau Legal System". In One Country, Two Systems, Three Legal Orders – Perspectives of Evolution: Essays on Macau's Autonomy After the Resumption of Sovereignty by China. Berlin: Springer. .
Fei, Chengkang (1996). Macao 400 Years. Translated by Wang Yintong and Sarah K. Schneewind. Shanghai: Shanghai Academy of Social Sciences.
Halis, Denis de Castro (2015). "'Post-Colonial' Legal Interpretation in Macau, China: Between European and Chinese Influences". In East Asia's Renewed Respect for the Rule of Law in the 21st Century. Leiden: Brill Nijhoff. .
Hao, Zhidong (2011). Macao History and Society. Hong Kong: Hong Kong University Press. .
Mendes, Carmen Amado (2013). Portugal, China and the Macau Negotiations, 1986–1999. Hong Kong: Hong Kong University Press. .

External links 

 
 Official website of the Portuguese Government of Macau (web archive)  (1999)

 

China–Portugal relations
Concessions in China
Former colonies in Asia
Macau
Macau

1557 establishments in Asia
1557 establishments in China
16th-century establishments in Macau
1557 establishments in the Portuguese Empire
1999 disestablishments in Asia
1999 disestablishments in China
1999 disestablishments in Macau
1999 disestablishments in the Portuguese Empire
States and territories established in 1557
States and territories disestablished in 1999